Waglan Island is a member of the Po Toi group of islands in Hong Kong. It hosts a ground of meteorological observation and recording.

Waglan lighthouse

The Waglan Lighthouse on Waglan Island has been listed as a declared monument of Hong Kong since 2000. It commenced operation in 1893; it is one of the five surviving pre-war lighthouses in Hong Kong.

Climate

See also 

 Hong Kong Observatory
 Green Island Lighthouse Compound
 Cape D'Aguilar Lighthouse
 Tang Lung Chau Lighthouse
 List of lighthouses in China
 SS Hsin Wah

References

Further reading

External links
 Hong Kong Observatory website
 Aerial image from Google Maps
 Map of Waglan Island
 Mr. Deacon, "About Waglan Lighthouse

Uninhabited islands of Hong Kong
Lighthouses in Hong Kong
Lighthouses completed in 1893
1893 establishments in Asia
Po Toi Islands
Islands of Hong Kong
Populated places in Hong Kong